Roberto Salcedo Gavilán (born Emeterio Antonio Salcedo Gavilán on 18 April 1953) is a Dominican politician, actor and television producer. Salcedo was mayor of Santo Domingo, D. N. from 2002 to 2016.

Biography

Salcedo was born into a poor family. His father was a marine who earned RD$ 14 (US$ 14) per month, and his mother was a needlewoman.

During the 2016 elections, he lost to David Collado, candidate of the Partido Revolucionario Moderno (Modern Revolutionary Party), who received 57.28% of the votes.

References

External links

1953 births
Dominican Republic male actors
Dominican Republic politicians
Living people
Mayors of places in the Dominican Republic